James Shelton may refer to:

James A. Shelton (1916–1942), posthumous Navy Cross
Jim Shelton, head of the Chan Zuckerberg Initiative's education division
James Shelton (songwriter), Broadway composer, songwriter of "Lilac Wine" (1950)
James Alan Shelton (1960–2014), American bluegrass guitarist
James Shelton Dickinson (1818-1882), American politician